In September 2016, the International Union for Conservation of Nature (IUCN) listed 3191 data deficient fish species. A data deficient species is one which has been categorized by the IUCN as offering insufficient information for a proper assessment of conservation status to be made. Of all evaluated fish species, 21% are listed as data deficient. 
The IUCN also lists 12 fish subspecies as data deficient.

Of the subpopulations of fishes evaluated by the IUCN, 34 species subpopulations have been assessed as data deficient.

This is a complete list of data deficient fish species and subspecies evaluated by the IUCN. Species and subspecies which have data deficient subpopulations (or stocks) are indicated.

Cartilaginous fishes
Chondrichthyes includes sharks, rays, skates, and sawfish. There are 475 species and three subpopulations of cartilaginous fish evaluated as data deficient.

Angelsharks

Rays and skates
There are 253 species and one subpopulation in the order Rajiformes evaluated as data deficient.

Narkids

Eagle rays

Guitarfish species

Whiptail stingrays

Narcinids
Species

Subpopulations
Apron ray (Discopyge tschudii) (1 subpopulation)

Butterfly rays

Skates

Urotrygonids

Potamotrygonids

Urolophids

Torpedinids

Skates

Anacanthobatidae

Other Rajiformes species

Ground sharks
There are 110 species and one subpopulation of ground shark evaluated as data deficient.

Hammerhead sharks
Scoophead (Sphyrna media)

Requiem sharks

Species

Subpopulations
Night shark (Carcharhinus signatus) (1 subpopulation)

Hemigaleids

Houndsharks

Catsharks

Proscylliids

Carpet sharks

Squaliformes
There are 67 species and one subpopulation in the order Squaliformes evaluated as data deficient.

Oxynotids

Centrophorids

Species

Subpopulations
Gulper shark (Centrophorus granulosus) (1 subpopulation)

Echinorhinids
Bramble shark (Echinorhinus brucus)

Squalids

Somniosids

Dalatiids

Etmopterids

Chimaeras
There are 20 Chimaera species evaluated as data deficient.

Chimaerids

Rhinochimaerids

Bullhead sharks

Other cartilaginous fish species

Lampreys

Ray-finned fishes
There are 2682 species, 12 subspecies, and one subpopulation of ray-finned fish evaluated as data deficient.

Salmoniformes

Species

Subspecies
Coregonus sardinella baunti
Subpopulations
Sockeye salmon (Oncorhynchus nerka) (31 subpopulations)

Silversides

Toothcarps
There are 75 species and two subspecies of toothcarp evaluated as data deficient.

Pupfish species

Aplocheilids

Rivulids

Nothobranchiids

Species

Subspecies
Aphyosemion cameronense haasi
Aphyosemion celiae winifredae

Poeciliids

Cypriniformes
Cypriniformes includes carps, minnows, loaches and relatives. There are 610 species and two subspecies in the order Cypriniformes evaluated as data deficient.

Hillstream loaches

True loaches

Cyprinids

Species

Subspecies
Osteobrama cotio peninsularis
Rhodeus atremius suigensis

Psilorhynchids

Suckers

Bonefishes

Gasterosteiformes

Osmeriformes

Catfishes
There are 439 catfish species evaluated as data deficient.

Amblycipitids

Heptapterids

Astroblepids

Sisorids

Silurids

Trichomycterids

Loach catfishes

Claroteids

Airbreathing catfishes

Loricariids

Mochokids

Stream catfishes

Ariids

Bagrids

Schilbeids

Callichthyids

Erethistids

Other catfish species

Gonorynchiformes

Batrachoidiformes

Elopiformes

Perciformes
There are 786 species and two subspecies in the order Perciformes evaluated as data deficient.

Temperate perches

Gouramis

Cichlids

Species

Subspecies
Cichlasoma urophthalmum ericymba
Pseudocrenilabrus multicolor multicolor

Terapontids

Odontobutidae

Epinephelids

Eleotrids

Gobies

Badids

Sparids

Scombrids

Dragonets

Lutjanids

Sand stargazers

Anabantidae

Sciaenids

Labrisomids

Serranids

Chaenopsids

Combtooth blennies

Microdesmids

Wrasses

Threefin blennies

Haemulids

Apogonids

Ambassids

Acanthurids

Butterflyfishes

Other Perciformes species

Beloniformes

Synbranchiformes

Gymnotiformes

Osteoglossiformes
There are 40 species in the order Osteoglossiformes evaluated as data deficient.

Mormyrids

Arapaimids
Arapaima (Arapaima gigas)

Gobiesociformes

Characiformes
There are 110 species in the order Characiformes evaluated as data deficient.

Alestids

Distichodontids

Characids

Crenuchids

Other Characiformes species

Syngnathiformes
Syngnathiformes includes the pipefishes and seahorses. There are 71 species and two subspecies in the order Syngnathiformes evaluated as data deficient.

Syngnathids

Species

Subspecies
Subtropical-tropical trunk-pouch pipefish (Microphis brachyurus aculeatus)
Opossum river pipefish (Microphis brachyurus lineatus)

Centriscids

Clupeiformes

Scorpaeniformes
There are 57 species and one subspecies in the order Scorpaeniformes evaluated as data deficient.

Cottids

Scorpaenids

Liparidae

Other Scorpaeniformes

Species

Subspecies
Spiny scorpionfish (Trachyscorpia cristulata echinata)

Ophidiiformes

Tetraodontiformes
There are 36 species in the order Tetraodontiformes evaluated as data deficient.

Tetraodontids

Filefish species

Ostraciids
Island cowfish (Acanthostracion notacanthus)

Porcupinefish species
Deepwater burrfish (Allomycterus pilatus)

Triggerfishes
Deepwater triggerfish (Rhinecanthus abyssus)

Gadiformes
There are 32 species in the order Gadiformes evaluated as data deficient.
MerlucciidsMerluccius gayiCortez hake (Merluccius hernandezi)

Grenadiers species

Morids

Lotids
Azores rockling (Gaidropsarus granti)Gaidropsarus guttatusMullets

BichirsPolypterus teugelsiEels
There are 50 eel species evaluated as data deficient.
Ophichthids

Congrids

Other eel species

Flatfishes
There are 58 species and two subspecies of flatfish evaluated as data deficient.
Soleids

Tonguefishes

Paralichthyids

Species

SubspeciesEtropus delsmani delsmaniEtropus delsmani pacificusBothids

Other flatfish species

Anglerfishes

Beryciformes

Stephanoberyciformes

Aulopiformes

Zeiformes
Smooth oreo (Pseudocyttus maculatus)
John Dory (Zeus faber'')

Stomiiformes

Cetomimiformes

Myctophiformes

Saccopharyngiformes

Hagfishes

See also 
 Lists of IUCN Red List data deficient species
 List of least concern fishes
 List of near threatened fishes
 List of vulnerable fishes
 List of endangered fishes
 List of critically endangered fishes
 List of recently extinct fishes
 Sustainable seafood advisory lists and certification

Notes

References 

Fishes
Data deficient fishes
Data deficient fishes
Data deficient fishes